St Buryan, Lamorna and Paul is a civil parish in Cornwall, England, United Kingdom. The parish had a population of 1,681 in the 2011 census. It was formed on 1 April 2021 with the merger of St Buryan and Paul.

References

External links

Civil parishes in Cornwall
2021 establishments in England
Penwith